Hindustan Dainik (or just Hindustan) is an Indian Hindi-language daily newspaper. According to Audit Bureau of Circulations, it is ranked 13th in the world by circulation and 6th in India. Madan Mohan Malaviya launched it in 1936. It is published by Hindustan Media Ventures Limited. Earlier it was part of HT Media Ltd group, which spun off its Hindi business into a separate company named Hindustan Media Ventures Limited in December 2009. 

It ranks as the second largest-read daily in the country. Hindustan has 21 editions across the Hindi belt. They are spread across Delhi, Haryana (Faridabad), Bihar (Patna, Muzaffarpur, Gaya, Bhagalpur and Purnea), Jharkhand (Ranchi, Jamshedpur and Dhanbad), Uttar Pradesh (Lucknow, Varanasi, Meerut, Agra, Allahabad, Gorakhpur, Bareilly, Moradabad, Aligarh, and Kanpur) and Uttarakhand (Dehradun, Haridwar, Haldwani). Apart from these, the paper is also available in key towns like Mathura, Saharanpur, Faizabad. The major editions of Hindustan are available online in epaper format.

In Bihar
Hindustan dominates in Bihar with an undisputed readership of about 5 million (as per the IRS 2011, Q4). It commands a massive 73% share of the Hindi readership market of Bihar. On 24 April 2018, Hindustan launched its 5th edition in Purnea. On 13 May 2016, a reporter was shot to death.

In Jharkhand
Hindustan has been the No. 1 newspaper of Jharkhand, ever since readership surveys have been reported for the state.

In Uttar Pradesh

Hindustan is expanding rapidly in the state of Uttar Pradesh, which is the largest Hindi newspaper market, and where it is the fastest growing Hindi daily. Apart from a long-standing presence in Lucknow and Varanasi, Hindustan was launched in Meerut, Agra and Kanpur in 2006.
In 2008, Hindustan launched in the cities of Mathura. 
In 2009, Hindustan launched in  Allahabad and Bareilly. 
In 2010, Hindustan launched in Gorakhpur as well.
In 2011, Hindustan launched in Aligarh, and in 2012 in Moradabad.

In Uttarakhand

Hindustan has made an entry into Uttarakhand with a printing location in Dehradun, in May 2008. This edition covers key cities in Uttarakhand and West UP (like Dehradun, Hrishikesh, Haridwar, Roorkee and Saharanpur). 
In Jan 2009, Hindustan started its edition in Haldwani.It has the highest numbers of readers in Uttarakhand at present.

See also
Print media in India

References

External links
 
epaper

Daily newspapers published in India
Hindi-language newspapers
Madan Mohan Malaviya
Newspapers published in Bhagalpur
Newspapers published in Delhi
Newspapers published in Gaya, India
Newspapers published in Muzaffarpur
Newspapers published in Patna
Newspapers published in Varanasi
Newspapers published in Aurangabad, Bihar
Publications established in 1936
Hindustan Times
1936 establishments in India